Alexandre Xavier Pereira Guedes (born 11 February 1994) is a Portuguese professional footballer who plays as a striker for F.C. Paços de Ferreira.

Club career

Sporting CP
Born in Arcozelo, Vila Nova de Gaia, Guedes joined Sporting CP's youth system in 2005, aged 11, and went on to score 53 goals for its various teams. On 16 December 2012, still a junior, he made his senior debut with the B side, coming on as a substitute for Bruma in the last minute of a 2–1 away win against C.D. Tondela in the Segunda Liga.

On 29 January 2014, Guedes was loaned to Spanish club CF Reus Deportiu until June, alongside teammate Tobias Figueiredo. He failed to find the net during his one-and-a-half-year stint in the Segunda División B with the Catalans.

Aves
In August 2015, Guedes agreed to a two-year deal at C.D. Aves in his country's second tier. He scored 13 goals in each of his first two seasons in Aves, helping to Primeira Liga promotion at the end of 2016–17 and subsequently renewing his contract.

Guedes made his debut in the top flight on 6 August 2017, playing the full 90 minutes in a 0–2 home loss to former club Sporting. On 5 May 2018, he was one of the scorers as the team won 3–0 at Moreirense F.C. in the penultimate round of games to ensure another year at the top tier. Fifteen days later, he netted twice to help to a 2–1 defeat of Sporting in the final of the Taça de Portugal.

Vitória Guimarães
Guedes left for Vitória S.C. on 4 July 2018 for a €500,000 fee on a five-year contract, with Aves maintaining 50% of his economic rights. He scored his first goals on 8 October, a brace in a 3–1 away victory over C.S. Marítimo. His team finished the campaign in fifth, and qualified for the UEFA Europa League.

In January 2020, Guedes was loaned to Vegalta Sendai of the Japanese J1 League.

Famalicão
Guedes returned to the Portuguese top division on 8 January 2021, signing a three-and-a-half-year deal with F.C. Famalicão. He failed to find the net during his spell, in eight starts.

Raków Częstochowa
On 23 July 2021, Guedes joined Polish Ekstraklasa club Raków Częstochowa on a three-year contract with an option to extend for a further two seasons. He made 11 appearances before leaving by mutual consent on 14 December.

Albirex Niigata
Guedes returned to Japan in March 2022, agreeing to a deal at J2 League's Albirex Niigata.

International career
While in representation of the Portugal under-19 side, Guedes was one of three top scorers at the 2013 UEFA European Championship in Lithuania with his tally of three goals. He recorded two in a 4–1 group win over the Netherlands and one more in a 2–2 draw with Serbia in the semi-finals, though his attempt was saved by Predrag Rajković as the Serbs won on penalties.

Club statistics

Honours
Aves
Taça de Portugal: 2017–18

Raków Częstochowa
Polish Cup: 2021–22

Albirex Niigata
J2 League: 2022

Individual
UEFA European Under-19 Championship top scorer: 2013 (shared with Gratas Sirgėdas and Anass Achahbar)

References

External links

1994 births
Living people
Sportspeople from Vila Nova de Gaia
Portuguese footballers
Association football forwards
Primeira Liga players
Liga Portugal 2 players
Sporting CP B players
C.D. Aves players
Vitória S.C. players
F.C. Famalicão players
F.C. Paços de Ferreira players
Segunda División B players
CF Reus Deportiu players
J1 League players
J2 League players
Vegalta Sendai players
Albirex Niigata players
Ekstraklasa players
Raków Częstochowa players
Portugal youth international footballers
Portuguese expatriate footballers
Expatriate footballers in Spain
Expatriate footballers in Japan
Expatriate footballers in Poland
Portuguese expatriate sportspeople in Spain
Portuguese expatriate sportspeople in Japan
Portuguese expatriate sportspeople in Poland